Bookmaking software provides a start-to-finish, self-publishing solution for end users. It combines the design capabilities of desktop publishing software applications with the connectivity of Web-based applications to seamlessly link desktop computers to remote digital printers, as well as online and offline distribution channels and commerce platforms.

This type of software application is made possible by digital printing, which enables smaller numbers of books to be printed on demand, as well as broadband and Web-based technology, which make it possible for larger amounts of data (e.g., software programs, files) to be distributed over a network.

While self-publishing is not new, the trend is being fueled by growing popularity of “participatory media” (such as social networking sites and blogs), which enable people to increasingly contribute to the media they consume.

See also
 Desktop publishing
BookSmart

References 

Desktop publishing software